

The Ascents of James (Greek: Anabathmoi Iacobou) is the title of a lost work briefly described in a heresiology known as the Panarion (30.16.6–9), by Epiphanius of Salamis; it was used as a source for a polemic against a Jewish Christian sect known as the Ebionites. The document advocated the abolition of the Jewish sacrifices, esteemed James, the brother of Jesus as the leader of the Jerusalem church, and denigrated Paul of Tarsus as a Gentile and an opponent of Jewish Law.

A Jewish Christian source document thought to be embedded within the Pseudo-Clementine Recognitions (1.27 or 1.33–71) and conventionally referred to by modern scholars as the Ascents of James may be related to the otherwise lost work mentioned by Epiphanius. Distinguishing features of the text include an advocacy for the observance of Mosaic Law and the elimination of the Jewish sacrifices. Paul is portrayed as a "certain hostile person" who prevents James from converting the Jewish people to Christianity (1.70.1–8). The text recounts the salvation history of Israel from Abraham to Jesus from a Jewish Christian perspective. Jesus is depicted as the anticipated prophet-like-Moses who was sent by God to complete the work of Moses by abolishing the sacrifices in order to redeem Israel.

Notes

Citations

Sources

Further reading 

2nd-century Christian texts
Ancient Christian texts
Jewish Christian literature
Lost religious texts